2ST is a commercial radio station that commenced broadcasting in 1972.  the station is owned by ARN. 2ST was an AM radio station serving the Shoalhaven and Southern Tablelands regions of New South Wales, Australia, broadcasting on the frequency 91.7 MHz. The "ST" suffix denotes the "South Coast and Tablelands" area that is the station's coverage area.

History
Over the years 2ST has improved the quality of broadcast signal in its coverage area by adding repeater transmitter services - FM 91.7 MHz Nowra, FM 102.9 MHz Bowral and FM 106.7 MHz Ulladulla.

The Bowral transmitter was originally 1215 kHz AM when it began in 1979; in 1999 it was converted to FM 102.9 MHz. Alternate local programming, such as the 2ST "Highlands" Breakfast and Morning Programs are broadcast from the 2ST Bowral Studio exclusively for the Southern Tablelands audience. All other programming comes from the 2ST main studio in North Nowra.

In the late 1980s a supplementary FM licence was granted to 2ST and the sister station Power FM 94.9 was launched. Power FM 94.9 broadcasts from the same premises as 2ST in North Nowra. Several announcers have moved back and forth between the two stations.

On 1 March 2021, 2ST switched off its AM transmitter on 999 kHz. 8 months later, in November 2021, 2ST, along with other stations owned by Grant Broadcasters, were acquired by the Australian Radio Network. This deal will allow Grant's stations, including 2ST, to access ARN's iHeartRadio platform in regional areas. The deal was finalized on January 4, 2022. It is expected 2ST will integrate with ARN's Pure Gold Network, but will retain its current name according to the press release from ARN.

On-air schedule

Weekdays

Saturdays

Sundays

 Local newsroom: Peter Andrea, Mitchell Kleem & Glenn Ellard

Previous 2ST announcers

 Steve Anderson
 Donn Berghofer
 Steve Blanda
 Paul Bongiorno
 Larry Bonser
 Gary Boyce
 Mike Byrne
 Paul Cashmere
 John Comber
 Greg Clarke
 Pete Diskon
 Geoff Field
 Brendan Forde
 Steve Fox
 Bruce Goldberg
 Chris Jackson
 David Lumsden
 Barry Mac
 Rick Machin
 Andrew Ogilvie
 Greg Pace
 Murray Peters
 Barry Sanders
 Barry Sandry
 Trevor Sinclair
 Mark Spurway
 Dave Stretton
 Brenton 'Thommo' Thompson
 Greg Toohey (deceased)
 Jamie Walter

Current 2ST Announcers
 Pete Brandtman
 Graeme Day (Bowral)
 Kev Marsh
 Charles Maxwell
 Glenn Stolzenhein
 Ian Holland (Bowral)

Notes

External links
 2ST station web site

Radio stations in New South Wales
Radio stations established in 1972
Classic hits radio stations in Australia
Australian Radio Network